Dylan Timber (born 15 April 2000) is a professional footballer who plays as a centre-back for Eerste divisie club Jong Utrecht. Born in the mainland Netherlands, he plays for the Curaçao national team.

Career
Timber is a youth product of DVSU Utrecht, Feyenoord, SV Kampong, SV Houten, and Sparta Nijkerk. On 11 May 2022, he signed with Jong Utrecht on a 2-year contract.

International career
Born in the mainland Netherlands, Timber was called up to the Curaçao national team for a set of friendlies in September 2022. He debuted with Curaçao in a friendly 3–2 loss to Indonesia on 25 September 2022.

Personal life
Born in the Netherlands, Timber of Aruban and Curaçaoan descent. His mother Marilyn is from Aruba and their father is from Curaçao, both parts of the ABC Islands in the Dutch Caribbean. Due to situations in the past, the family took on their maternal name Timber instead of taking the last name of their father Maduro. He has four brothers Shamier, Chris, and twins Quinten and Jurriën Timber

References

External links
 

Living people
2000 births
Sportspeople from Utrecht (city)
Curaçao footballers
Curaçao international footballers
Dutch footballers
Curaçao people of Aruban descent
Dutch people of Curaçao descent
Dutch people of Aruban descent
Jong FC Utrecht players
Eerste Divisie players
Association football defenders